Jaromar II, Prince of Rügen ( – 20 August 1260) was a Slavic nobleman.  He was the ruling Prince of Rügen from 1249 until his death.

Life 
He was first mentioned on 8 November 1231.  From 28 September 1246, he was co-ruler with his father, Prince Vitslav I.  During the early years of his reign, he tried to maintain peaceful relations with his neighbours, the Dukes of Pomerania, especially with the princes of Gützkow, who were vassals of Barnim I.  He promoted trade by outlawing wrecking and providing safe passage for merchant ships from Lübeck.  In 1249, troops from Lübeck destroyed the city of Stralsund; this resulted in a war which lasted four years, during which Stralsund's privateers were allowed to capture ships from Lübeck.  All privileges granted to Lübeck were suspended, until the paid compensation for the damage done to Stralsund.

Jaromar II donated land to the three Cistercian monasteries in his territory, in Bergen auf Rügen, Neuenkamp, and Hilda.  In 1252, he donated the Radevice Land in Mönchgut to Hilda Abbey, near Greifswald.  He supported the settlement of other religious orders in his territory.  The Dominicans founded the St. Catherine monastery in Stralsund; the Franciscans founded the St. John monastery, also in Stralsund, in 1254.  In 1255, he granted Lübeck style city rights to Barth and in 1258 to Damgarten.

Jaromar II was an ardent supporter of the archbishops in the Danish domestic struggle between the Danish king and the archbishops Jakob Erlandsen of Lund and Peder Bang of Roskilde.  In Peder Bang escaped from a Danish prison, into exile in Schaprode in Rügen.  In April of the year, Jaromir II and Peder Bang landed on the main Danish island of Zealand and took the city of Copenhagen.  They probably committed some serious acts of violence in the process, and burned down a large part of Copenhagen, after looting the city.  King Christopher I of Denmark suddenly died in Ribe in May 1259.  His widow, Margaret Sambiria, took up the regency for her underage son Eric V.  She raised a peasant army, which was defeated by Jaromar II at Næstved.  After devastating Zealand, Scania and Lolland, he landed with his army on Bornholm, where he destroyed the royal fortress at Lilleborg.  A woman seeking revenge stabbed him with a dagger on Bornholm, or in Skane in 1260.  It is unknown where he was buried; perhaps in Bergen auf Rügen Abbey or in Neuenkamp Abbey in Franzburg.

Marriage and issue 
Jaromar II married Euphemia, a daughter of Swietopelk II, Duke of Pomerania.  Together, they had three children:
 Vitslav II (1240-1302), his successor
 Margaret ( – 1272), married Duke Eric I of Schleswig
 Jaromar III (before 1249 – 1282), co-ruler with Vitslav II

References 

Joachim Wächter: Das Fürstentum Rügen  Ein Überblick, in: Beiträge zur Geschichte Vorpommerns: die Demminer Kolloquien 1985–1994, Thomas Helms Verlag, Schwerin, 1997,

External links 
The children of Jaromar II on the home page of Jens Ruge 
Rugia under Danish sovereignty, taken from Otto Wendler: Geschichte Rügens — von der ältesten Zeit bis auf die Gegenwart, 1895

Footnotes 

Princes of Rügen
13th-century births
1260 deaths
Year of birth unknown
13th-century German nobility